Stermann is a surname. Notable people with the surname include:

Catherine Stermann (1949–1985), French actress
Dirk Stermann (born 1965), German comedian of the duo Stermann & Grissemann

See also
Sterman
Stearman